Omar is an unincorporated community in Seneca County, in the U.S. state of Ohio.

History
Omar had its start in 1854 when the railroad was extended into the area. A post office called Omar was established in 1874, and remained in operation until 1935.

See also
 Omar Chapel

References

Unincorporated communities in Seneca County, Ohio
Unincorporated communities in Ohio